Broadleaf Commerce is a software technology company headquartered in Dallas, Texas, providing a Java eCommerce platform based on Spring Framework.

History 
Broadleaf Commerce was founded in 2008  by Brian Polster with backing from Credera Finance.

In July 2010, Broadleaf launched the first version of their open source software.

On January 1, 2012, Broadleaf Commerce became an independent entity and gained legal separation from Credera Finance.

In 2015, Broadleaf was selected for the 2015 Best of Addison Award in the eCommerce Framework category by the Addison Award Program.

In 2016, Broadleaf was recognized by Texas A&M University in their 2016 Aggie 100 list. Broadleaf ranked 44th with an average growth rate of 43%.

In 2017, Broadleaf was recognized by Inc. Magazine in their Inc. 5000 list. Broadleaf ranked 2420 on the list with a 3-year growth rate of 149%.

In 2017, Broadleaf was recognized by Texas A&M University in their 2017 Aggie 100 list. Broadleaf ranked 35th with an average growth rate of 45.8%.

Products

Broadleaf Community Edition 
Broadleaf Community Edition is the free version of the open source content management system (CMS). In addition to the management of products and catalog information, this edition provides a WYSIWYG editor to manage items such as blogs and pre-defined content pages.

Broadleaf B2C Enterprise Edition 
This edition requires an enterprise license. The B2C Edition enables cross-team collaboration for website management, campaigns, order lifecycle management, and customer service functionalities through a single administrative console. Features include CSR assisted shopping, RMA code generation, and system blocks for potentially fraudulent orders.

Broadleaf B2B Enterprise Edition 
The B2B Enterprise Edition requires an enterprise license. This system handles multiple fulfillment centers, vendors, suppliers, and end buyers.

Broadleaf Multi-Tenant Enterprise Edition 
The system provides one administrative interface to set permissions for individual franchise site management and deploy changes across all franchise site properties. This edition manages multiple disparate sites, allows vendors to upload, price, and promote their own products independently.

Broadleaf Commerce Microservices 
The framework includes 30+ microservices containing extensible commerce service components built on Java and Spring as well as a centralized metadata-driven back office admin framework built in React.

Broadleaf Commerce Cloud 
In 2022, Broadleaf Commerce launched a cloud Platform as a Service (PaaS) platform. The tech stack consists of a full suite of eCommerce capabilities including browse and search, cart, checkout, catalog management. The solution also utilizes headless APIs with extension patterns using the technologies Java, Spring Boot, and React. The solution can be deployed with Broadleaf Microservices on-prem, on an external cloud, or to the Broadleaf Cloud.

Product Features 
 Cart & checkout
 Content management
 Customer management
 Framework
 Modules
 Multi-Channel
 Multi-Currency
 Multi-Device
 Multi-Lingual
 Multi-Site
 Multi-Tenant
 Offers & promotions
 Order management
 Product management
 Search & browse
 Themes

Reception 
Since its launch, Broadleaf Commerce has been reviewed by tech websites and blogs such as Forrester, Orderhive, TechWorld, CIO, ComputerWorld UK, and Chain Store Age.

Tech Blog Divante, developer community Stack Overflow, and tech blog Zoocha have also reviewed the services.

Clients 
castAR
The Container Store
Ganz
Icon Health & Fitness
O'Reilly Auto Parts
Pep Boys*castAR

References

External links 
 
 GitHub repository
 Forum

Software companies based in Texas
Internet properties established in 2008
Software companies of the United States